Pozzoni is an Italian surname. Notable people with the surname include:

 Dominic Pozzoni (1861–1924), Italian-born Bishop
 Paola Pozzoni (born 1965), Italian cross-country skier

See also
 Pozzoli

Italian-language surnames